Pterolophia barbieri is a species of beetle in the family Cerambycidae. It was described by Stephan von Breuning in 1973.

References

barbieri
Beetles described in 1973